USS Corbesier may refer to the following ships of the United States Navy:

 , a planned  that was transferred to the Free French Naval Forces as Sénégalais in 1943; permanently transferred to France in 1952; scrapped in 1965
 , a  launched in 1944; decommissioned in 1946; scrapped in 1973

United States Navy ship names